Donald Yacovone (born February 25, 1952) is an American researcher, writer and academic who primarily specializes in African American History. In 2013, he co-authored with Henry Louis Gates Jr the book based on the PBS television series The African Americans: Many Rivers to Cross.

Education
Born on February 25, 1952, in Hartford, Connecticut, to Alfred F. and Mary E. (Ostrowska) Yacovone, Donald Yacovone earned his Bachelor of Science from Southern Connecticut State University in 1974. He went on to earn a Master of Arts from Trinity College in Hartford, Connecticut, in 1977 and then earned his Doctor of Philosophy from Claremont Graduate School in 1984.

Career
In 2013, Yacovone co-authored The African Americans: Many Rivers to Cross with Henry Louis Gates Jr, a book of the television series hosted by Gates Jr. The book has been criticized by some for not dating back to pre-slavery times.

Yacovone has written for The Chronicle of Higher Education on the topic of racism through history in textbooks and in academia.

Bibliography
Freedom's Journey: African American Voices of the Civil War (The Library of Black America series) – February 2004
Samuel Joseph May and the Dilemmas of the Liberal Persuasion, 1797-1871
As Editor
Wendell Phillips, Social Justice, and the Power of the Past - November, 2016

References

1952 births
Living people
Claremont Graduate University alumni
Southern Connecticut State University alumni
Trinity College (Connecticut) alumni
21st-century American historians
21st-century American male writers
Historians of race relations
Writers from Hartford, Connecticut
Historians from California
Historians from Connecticut
American male non-fiction writers